Nicholas or Nick Barber may refer to:

Musicians
Doof (musician), real name Nick Barber (born 1968)
Aaron Sprinkle, musician, real name Nick Barber (born 1974)

Others
Nicholas Barber (writer) who worked with Nick Percival
Nicholas Barber (MP) for Dunwich
Nicholas Barber, character in Morality Play